BCSN is a four-letter acronym for two Cable television networks in the United States:

 Black College Sports Network
 Buckeye Cable Sports Network